The 1958 Wisconsin Badgers football team represented the University of Wisconsin in the 1958 Big Ten Conference football season.

Schedule

Game summaries

Minnesota

    
    
    
    
    
    

Wisconsin completed their best Big Ten finish since 1952 in front of a Dad's Day crowd as their defense intercepted six passes, one short of their own conference record.

Team players in the 1959 NFL Draft

References

Further reading
 Haney, Richard Carlton. "Canceled Due to Racism: The Wisconsin Badger Football Games against Louisiana State in 1957 and 1958". Wisconsin Magazine of History, vol. 92, no. 1 (Autumn 2008): 44-53.

Wisconsin
Wisconsin Badgers football seasons
Wisconsin Badgers football